The Callistosporiaceae are a family of fungi in the order Agaricales. The family contains six genera. All species form agaricoid basidiocarps (gilled mushrooms). The family is based on recent DNA research.

References

 Agaricales
Agaricales families